People's Doctor of the USSR was an honorary title granted to doctors of the Soviet Union; it was established on 25 October 1977 by Leonid Brezhnev and its creation was officialized on the n°44/1977 issue of Supreme Soviet's official journal. Its regulation was later modified and completed by the Supreme Soviet's decree of 22 August 1988.

It was conferred by the Supreme Soviet's presidency on behalf of the Ministry of Health. A diploma of the Supreme Soviet's presidency was given to those who were appointed People's Doctor jointly with the medal and its concerning certificate. The title could be bestowed to individual medical doctors and nurses but also to health care structures as general hospitals, sanatoriums, maternity wards or preventive medicine centres.

The awarded people or structures were selected for their worthwhile contributions to public health improvement, for their peculiar skills and expertise and for having proved abnegation and high moral qualities in their duties fulfilment.

Following the Dissolution of the Soviet Union in 1991, the title did not disappear. On 30 December 1995, by a decree of the Russian presidency, it was created the new title of Meritorious Doctor of the Russian Federation.

The title was first bestowed on 9 August 1978, when five people were awarded:
 Viktor Nikolayevich Vasilenko
 Lyudmila Vasilievna Yevstratova
 Viktor Mikhailovich Ilin
 Lyudmila Nilolayevna Mikhailova
 Zagipa Madievna Madiyeva
The last doctor to be praised was Dr. Vitaly Prokopievich Sergeyev from Osh (Kirghiz SSR), whom the medal was conferred on 20 December 1991.

Design 
The medal was made of tombac and its shape was roughly quadrangular (22.5 x 23.5 mm). The central part was occupied by the inscription "Народный врач СССР" (People's Doctor of the USSR) on three lines and below, on the left, the Bowl of Hygieia medical symbol and, on the right, a bay laurel branch. Symbols and inscriptions were embossed, with convex letters. The medal was suspended to a single red silk fringe (18 mm x 21 mm) to whom it was attached by a metallic buckle bearing the hammer and sickle symbol.

References

See also
 Awards and decorations of the Soviet Union
 People's Artist of the USSR
 People's Architect of the USSR
 People's Teacher of the USSR
 List of medicine awards

Honorary titles of the Soviet Union
Civil awards and decorations of the Soviet Union
Awards established in 1977
Medicine awards
1977 establishments in the Soviet Union
Health in the Soviet Union